I Wanna Be A Model (我要做Model4) featured a cast of 16 contestants (eight male models and eight female models) who competed with each other to become the ultimate male and female supermodel. The participants had to outshine each other through the tasks of model company interview, catwalk, personal makeup, personal styling, pendulum, still photo shooting, TV commercial shooting and magazine cover shooting.

Among with the prize was: a one-year modeling contract with Sun Esee Model Management in Hong Kong & Shanghai and a cash prize of RM10,000.

Contestants

Episode guide

Episode 1
Original air date: May 1, 2016

The episode showcases the auditions in Kuala Lumpur, and the 16 finalists are selected.

 Best Picture of The Week: Bryan and Liz

Episode 2
Original air date: May 8, 2016

 Challenge winners: Celeste and Jay
 Best Picture of The Week: Benji, Emmy, Jayden and Yvonne
 Bottom-four: Bryan, Dickson, Gavin and Jesper
 Eliminated: None

Episode 3
Original Airdate: May 15, 2016

 Challenge winners: Jayden and Yvonne
 Best Picture of The Week: Bryan and Janice
 Bottom-six: Dickson, Emmy, Gavin, Jesper, Varent and Zing
 Eliminated: Dickson and Emmy

Episode 4
Original Airdate: May 22, 2016

 Challenge winners: Celeste and Jay
 Eliminated: Zing
 Quit: Benjamin

Episode 5
Original Airdate: May 29, 2016

 Challenge winners: Benji, Bryan, Celeste and Yvonne
 Best Picture of The Week: Jesper and Liz
 Bottom-two: Celeste and Gavin
 Eliminated: None

Episode 6
Original Airdate: June 5, 2016

 Best Picture of The Week: Gavin and Liz
 Eliminated: Benji and Varent

Episode 7
Original Airdate: June 12, 2016

 Challenge winners: Celeste and Jayden
 Best Picture of The Week: Janice and Jayden

Episode 8
Original Airdate: June 19, 2016

 Challenge winners: Bryan and Celeste
 Best Picture of The Week: Janice and Jay
 Eliminated: Jesper and Yvonne

Episode 9
Original Airdate: June 26, 2016

 Challenge winners: Janice and Jay

Episode 10
Original Airdate: July 3, 2016

 Challenge winners: Celeste and Jayden
 Best Picture of The Week: Bryan and Celeste

Episode 11
Original Airdate: July 10, 2016

 Challenge winners: Jay and Yann
 Best Picture of The Week:Janice and Jayden
 Eliminated: Gavin, Jayden, Liz and Yann

Episode 12
Original Airdate: July 17, 2016

Episode 13: Grand Finals
Original Airdate: July 24, 2016

 Winners: Bryan and Janice
 Runners-up: Celeste and Jay

Summaries

Elimination chart

 Male Contestant
 Female Contestant
 Green background with the word WINNER means the contestant won the competition
 Green background with the word WIN means the contestant won "Best Picture of The Week"
 Olive background with the word OUT means the contestant won "Best Picture of The Week" but was eliminated
 Orange background with the word LOW means the contestant was part of the bottom
 Red background with the word OUT means the contestant was eliminated from the competition
 Red background with the word QUIT means the contestant quitted the competition

Photo-shoot guide
 Episode 1 Photo shoot: Comp cards
 Episode 2 Photo shoot: Catalog shoot Challenge
 Episode 3 Photo shoot: Close-ups beauty shoot Challenge; B&W emotions with Amber Chia
 Episode 5 Photo shoot: Sexy at the beach
 Episode 6 Photo shoot: Creepy crawlies
 Episode 7 Photo shoot: Editorial headpiece beauty shoot
 Episode 8 Photo shoot: Avant-garde bodypaint beauty shoot; Retro couple 
 Episode 9 Photo shoot: Gender bending; Mod-Cultural
 Episode 10 Photo shoot: Emotions & Movements
 Episode 11 Photo shoot: Recreating Iconic Paintings; Citta Bella magazine cover challenge
 Episode 12 Photo shoot: Neu-Old Shanghai editorial; Posing alongside a Vintage Volvo with Shir; High fashion editorial

Hosts
 Lynn Lim

Judges
 Colin Sim
 Shir Chong
 Sean Feng

External links
Official Website (archive at the Wayback Machine)

References

I Wanna Be A Model
2016 Malaysian television seasons